Buses are a common form of public transport in Barcelona, with an extensive local and interurban bus network. There is also a network of night buses called Nitbus (es) and a transitway system called RetBus is currently being developed, which is intended to complement the current local bus network. All bus routes serving Barcelona metropolitan area are organized by Autoritat del Transport Metropolità (ATM). Local services are operated in most part by Transports Metropolitans de Barcelona (TMB), although other bus services are operated by several private companies under common names.

History

Operation

Local buses

The local bus network is very extended and reaches all neighbourhoods in Barcelona including some municipalities attached to the city and the airport. Local buses are operated in most part by Transports Metropolitans de Barcelona (TMB) although there are some lines which are operated by private sector companies under contract to TMB. There are over 100 urban lines serving the city and most of them pass through two or more districts, covering relatively long distances within Barcelona. Because of this, some lines called Bus del Barri (meaning The Neighbourhood's Bus in Catalan) were created. These lines are operated by small buses and cover short-haul routes enabling access to various parts of the neighbourhood as the shopping area, health care services, education centers and other facilities.

New Bus Network
In 2011, TMB announced plans for an improved bus network, initially dubbed "RetBus". This was introduced in 6 phases between 2012 and 2018 which established 28 high performance lines: 17 vertical (sea-mountain), 8 horizontal (Llobregat-Besòs) and 3 diagonal.

Interurban buses
The interurban bus service links Barcelona with the other towns in the metropolitan area. See the timetables of the various buses by searching the AMB (Àrea Metropolitana de Barcelona) website.

Nitbus
During the night, the company NitBus provides a night-time bus service in Barcelona and the first metropolitan ring with 17 lines. All of them, except the N0, go through Plaça de Catalunya, where you can change to other lines.

Aerobús

Tour buses

Long distance buses

Other

Numbering and pricing

See also
 Transport in Barcelona
 Autoritat del Transport Metropolità
 Transports Metropolitans de Barcelona
 Urban planning of Barcelona

References

External links
 Transports Metropolitans de Barcelona
 
 TMB iBus
 Local bus network map
 Autobuses BCN. Unofficial website about the history of bus lines within Barcelona and Catalonia.
 Mobilitat. Àrea Metropolitana de Barcelona
 Buses and Public Transportation in Barcelona

Transport in Barcelona
Bus transport in Spain